Bechenheim is an Ortsgemeinde – a municipality belonging to a Verbandsgemeinde, a kind of collective municipality – in the Alzey-Worms district in Rhineland-Palatinate, Germany. It belongs to the Verbandsgemeinde of Alzey-Land, whose seat is in Alzey.

Geography

Location 
As a winegrowing centre, Bechenheim lies in Germany's biggest winegrowing district, in the southwest of Rhenish Hesse. Bechenheim is Rhenish Hesse's highest winegrowing municipality.

History 
In 824, Bechenheim had its first documentary mention in a document from Fulda Abbey.

Politics

Municipal council 
The council is made up of 8 council members and the honorary mayor as chairman. The municipal election held on 7 June 2009 yielded the following results:

Coat of arms 
The municipality's arms might be described thus: Gules a dexter arm embowed armed argent, the hand naked of the same and holding a beaker Or.

Economy and infrastructure

Winegrowing 
Bechenheim belongs to the “Wonnegau Winegrowing Area” (Weinbaubereich Wonnegau) in Rhenish Hesse. Active in the municipality are six winegrowing businesses with 33 ha of vineyard under cultivation. Some 76% of the wine made there is white varieties (as at 2007). In 1979, 22 such businesses were still running, and vineyards covered 32 ha.

References

External links 
 Municipality’s official webpage 

Rhenish Hesse
Alzey-Worms